Robert D. McTeer Jr. (born ) is an American economist, and has been a fellow at the US National Center for Policy Analysis since January 2007. McTeer is a former president of the Federal Reserve Bank of Dallas (1981-1991), and a former chancellor of the Texas A&M University System.

Early life 

Born in the U.S. state of Georgia, he earned his BBA and Ph.D. in economics from the University of Georgia where he is a member of the Sigma Chi fraternity and was also a member of the Phi Kappa Literary Society. He taught there for two years before joining the Federal Reserve Bank of Richmond.

Professional career 

He worked for the Federal Reserve for 36 years, including as president of the Federal Reserve Bank of Dallas from 1991–2005, where he was known for his plain, jargon-free public speaking and telling stories about growing up in rural Georgia. He has stated that one of his goals was "to translate economic sense into common sense".

As a member of the Federal Open Market Committee on the Federal Reserve, he was considered "dovish" on inflation and was one of the most consistent opponents of raising the federal funds rate in the late 1990s. He has stated that he does not believe in the NAIRU and Phillips curve.

He was succeeded as Federal Reserve Bank President by Richard W. Fisher.

Academia career 

On November 4, 2004, he succeeded A. Benton Cocanougher as the chancellor of the Texas A&M University System, until November 22, 2006, when he was succeeded by Michael D. McKinney.

Television appearances 

He is a frequent economics commentator on CNBC's Kudlow & Company.

References

External links
 

1940s births
Living people
21st-century American economists
Chancellors of Texas A&M University System
Economists from Texas
Federal Reserve Bank of Dallas presidents
Economists from Georgia (U.S. state)
Terry College of Business alumni
Year of birth uncertain